Loyish— A town in the Akdarya district of the Samarkand region of the Republic of Uzbekistan (since 1984). Administrative center of the district. The regional center and the nearest railway station are 36 km from Samarkand. The population is 11.5 thousand people (2002). It takes water from Akdaryo.The name of the town is related to its location. It is assumed that Loyish got its name from the reeds and swamps between the branches of the Zarafshan river - between Akdarya and Karadarya. In the town there is a district government building, brick, canning factories, construction organizations, communication department, cultural, commercial and household service outlets, 1 specialized 2 general education, music, special boarding schools, pedagogical college, cultural house, central library, stadium, culture and there is a recreation park (a memorial to those who died in the war was erected in the park), a hospital and other medical facilities. Katta Zarafshan highway passes through Loyish area.

References

Populated places in Samarqand Region
Urban-type settlements in Uzbekistan